Cochylimorpha jaculana is a species of moth of the family Tortricidae. It is found in China (Anhui, Beijing, Hebei, Heilongjiang, Inner Mongolia, Jilin, Ningxia, Shaanxi, Shandong, Shanxi, Sichuan, Tianjin, Yunnan), Japan, Korea and Mongolia.

References

 

J
Moths of Asia
Moths of Japan
Moths of Korea
Moths described in 1883